Elvira Possekel (born April 11, 1953) is a West German athlete, who competed mainly in the 100 metres.

Possekel competed for West Germany in the 1976 Summer Olympics held in Montreal, Quebec, Canada in the 4 × 100 m relay, where she won the silver medal with her teammates: 100 m bronze medalist Inge Helten, Olympic 100 m champion Annegret Richter and Annegret Kroniger.

In 1977, Possekel was part of the European Select 4 × 100 m relay team, who ran 42.51 secs (1 hundredth outside the WR) to win at the first World Cup.

References

Sports Reference

1953 births
Living people
West German female sprinters
Athletes (track and field) at the 1976 Summer Olympics
Olympic athletes of West Germany
Olympic silver medalists for West Germany
Athletes from Cologne
Medalists at the 1976 Summer Olympics
Olympic silver medalists in athletics (track and field)
Olympic female sprinters